Enoplognatha latimana is a species of cobweb spider in the family Theridiidae. It is found in Canada, Europe, North Africa, Turkey, Caucasus, and Central Asia.

References

External links

 

Theridiidae
Articles created by Qbugbot
Spiders described in 1982